The South~West Middle School, formerly the South Junior High School and Reay E. Sterling Middle School, is a state of the art school building at 444 Granite Street in Quincy, Massachusetts. It is part of the Quincy Public Schools. The original school was in a Classical Revival style building was designed by Shephard & Stearns, and built in 1927.  Of three junior high schools built by the city in the 1920s, it is the best preserved. It is a large U-shaped two-story brick building, with a flat roof and a raised basement. Its main facade is symmetrical, with slightly projecting end pavilions and a central entry pavilion.

The building was listed on the National Register of Historic Places in 1989.

See also
National Register of Historic Places listings in Quincy, Massachusetts

References

External links
Sterling Middle School web site

School buildings on the National Register of Historic Places in Massachusetts
Neoclassical architecture in Massachusetts
School buildings completed in 1927
Schools in Norfolk County, Massachusetts
Buildings and structures in Quincy, Massachusetts
National Register of Historic Places in Quincy, Massachusetts
1927 establishments in Massachusetts